Dmitry Buinitsky (born March 1, 1997) is a Belarusian professional ice hockey forward. He is currently an unrestricted free agent who was most recently contracted with HC Dinamo Minsk of the Kontinental Hockey League (KHL).

Playing career
On February 27, 2015, Buinitsky made his Kontinental Hockey League debut playing with HC Dinamo Minsk during the 2014–15 KHL season.

In order to continue his development, Buinitsky played two seasons of junior in North America with the Madison Capitols of the United States Hockey League (USHL) and the Quebec Remparts of the Quebec Major Junior Hockey League (QMJHL), before returning undrafted to resume his professional career with Dinamo Minsk in the 2017–18 season.

Buinitsky played two seasons with Minsk, scoring 10 goals in 36 games in the 2018–19 season, before leaving as a free agent to sign a three-year contract with Russian club, Metallurg Magnitogorsk, on May 8, 2019.

References

External links

1997 births
Living people
HC Dinamo Minsk players
Belarusian ice hockey forwards
Madison Capitols players
Metallurg Magnitogorsk players
Sportspeople from Vitebsk
Quebec Remparts players
Belarusian expatriate sportspeople in the United States
Belarusian expatriate sportspeople in Canada
Belarusian expatriate sportspeople in Russia
Expatriate ice hockey players in the United States
Expatriate ice hockey players in Canada
Expatriate ice hockey players in Russia
Belarusian expatriate ice hockey people